The 43rd Mississippi Infantry Regiment was a regiment of infantry in the Confederate States Army. It fought in many battles and campaigns of the American Civil War. It was known as "The Camel Regiment".

Organization
The 43rd Mississippi Infantry Regiment was organized on August 7, 1862, and commanded by Colonel William Hudson Moore.

Company A – Frank Rodgers Rifles (Monroe County)
Company B – Lowndes Riflemen (Lowndes County)
Company C – Whitfield Guards (Monroe County)
Company D – Capt. Thompson's Company (Choctaw County)
Company E – Capt. Smith's Company (Pontotoc County)
Company F – Capt. Hampton's Company (Lowndes County)
Company G – Capt. Winter's Company (Monroe County)
Company H – Itawamba Tigers (Itawamba County)
Company I – Capt. Banks Company (Lowndes County)
Company K – Kemper Fencibles (Kemper County)
Company L – Gholson's Rebels (Monroe County)

Service history
Serving in the Army of the West of Gen. Sterling Price, the first battle that the 43rd fought was at Iuka. At the Battle of Second Corinth Colonel William Hudson Moore add Lieutenant-Colonel Richard W. Leigh were killed by Union forces. After the battle, Richard Harrison was promoted to Colonel and Columbus "Lum" Sykes promoted to Lieutenant-Colonel. 

Their next battles were during Union Gen. Ulysses S. Grant's Vicksburg Campaign between April and July 1863. At the Siege of Vicksburg a mine blew up killing six members from the 43rd. The regiment was part of General Hebert's brigade defending the Third Louisiana Redan.

In September 1863, Company H (Captain Merriman Pound's Battalion) of the 43rd Mississippi was ordered to join Braxton Bragg's Army of the Tennessee in Georgia. Pound's Battalion fought at the Battle of Chickamauga. Chickamauga was a victory for the Confederacy. 

After Chickamauga, Pound's Battalion was sent back to Mississippi and some of the 43rd rode with General Forrest to drive Union forces out of the state]. The regiment was sent to Georgia to fight in the Atlanta Campaign against William T. Sherman's invading Federal army]. In Cobb County, Georgia, the regiment hauled cannons up the side of Kennesaw Mountain. 

After Atlanta was lost, the 43rd fought in General John Bell Hood's Tennessee Campaign which included the Battles of Franklin and Nashville. Afterwards it was sent to the Carolinas and fought at the Battles of Kinston and Bentonville, North Carolina. 

The 43rd Mississippi was part of the Gen. Joe Johnston's surrender of the Army of Tennessee at Bennett Place on April 26, 1865. The army was soon disbanded and the men of the 43rd walked back to their home state and rebuilt their communities.

See also
List of Mississippi Civil War Confederate units

Notes

References

Military units and formations disestablished in 1865
Military units and formations established in 1862
Units and formations of the Confederate States Army from Mississippi
1862 establishments in Mississippi